Hyblaea junctura is a moth in the family Hyblaeidae described by Francis Walker in 1865.

References

Hyblaeidae